The 1937 GP Ouest-France was the seventh edition of the GP Ouest-France cycle race and was held on 1 September 1937. The race started and finished in Plouay. The race was won by Jean-Marie Goasmat.

General classification

References

1937
1937 in road cycling
1937 in French sport